James Omondi (born 17 February 1958) is a Kenyan boxer. He competed in the men's heavyweight event at the 1984 Summer Olympics.

References

External links
 

1958 births
Living people
Kenyan male boxers
Olympic boxers of Kenya
Boxers at the 1984 Summer Olympics
Place of birth missing (living people)
Heavyweight boxers